The Newport and Narragansett Bay Railroad is a heritage railroad that operates on Aquidneck Island, Rhode Island. It was formed in 2014-15 from the merger of the for-profit Newport Dinner Train and the nonprofit Old Colony and Newport Scenic Railway.

History

Scheduled passenger service between Fall River, Massachusetts and Newport, Rhode Island on the Newport Secondary ended in 1938, and the New Haven Railroad and its successors never made large profits from freight service on the line. Penn Central attempted to abandon the line in 1973; three years later, Conrail took over the line and sold the southern section to the state. The state in turned leased its section to the nonprofit, volunteer-run Old Colony and Newport Scenic Railway.

The railroad operated with two GE 45-ton switchers (#84 and #4764) and a volunteer-owned Porter-built 50-ton centercab switcher (#7349). Passenger stock included an ex-Boston and Maine Railroad coach (#74) built in 1904 by the Laconia Car Company and an 1884 (?) parlor car (#73) built as an office car for the Intercolonial Railway in the Maritimes of Canada. An ex-Pennsylvania Railroad N5B caboose and an ex-Southern Railway flatcar were used for work equipment.

The Sakonnet River rail bridge was damaged in 1988 and removed in 2007, isolating the line from the national rail network. Despite this, the for-profit Newport Dinner Train began sharing the line in 1997, offering dinner trains and other tourist-based operations. The relationship between the two operators, which had to share the primarily single-track line, was at times rocky.

The Newport Dinner Train began using ex-Branford Steam Railroad GE 44-ton switcher #6 for motive power in 2006; it was brought to the island by a barge. The railroad also owned two dining cars (one ex-Atlantic Coast Line Railroad, the other ex-Pennsylvania Railroad) and an ex-Long Island Railroad parlor car. In October 2006, the railroad purchased two former Wilton Scenic Railroad Budd RDCs.

By early 2013, the dinner train 
operation was offered for sale. It was sold in November 2014 and rebranded as the Newport and Narragansett Bay Railroad Company. The Old Colony and Newport ceased operations in early 2015 and eventually merged into the Newport and Narragansett Bay.

Equipment

Locomotives

Rolling stock
Dining Car Aquidneck Spruce
Theater Car Atlantic Rose
Dashing Dan's Clam Car
Kitchen Bellevue Clipper

References

External links

https://trainsri.com/ official website

Heritage railroads in Rhode Island
Transportation in Newport County, Rhode Island
Tourist attractions in Newport County, Rhode Island
2014 mergers and acquisitions
Railway companies established in 2014